The Whale is a "dramatic cantata" written by the English composer John Tavener in 1966.

Composition
The work is loosely based on the biblical allegory of Jonah and the Whale, although Tavener admitted that "The 'fantasy' grew and perhaps at times nearly 'swallowed' the biblical text: so the swallowing of Jonah became almost 'literal' in the biblical sense."

The libretto includes the words of an encyclopaedia entry describing certain facts about the whale, and this is contrasted with themes within the music which attempt to portray the reality of the whale itself, whose existence is greater than the sum of all the facts about it.

The Whale has eight sections: I. Documentary, II. Melodrama and Pantomime, III. Invocation. IV. The Storm, V. The Swallowing, VI. The Prayer. VII. In the Belly, and VIII. The Vomiting.

Release
It was premiered at the inaugural concert of the London Sinfonietta under David Atherton at the Queen Elizabeth Hall on 24 January 1968. It was heard again at a Proms concert on 1 August 1969, with the same orchestra and conductor, with vocal soloists Anna Reynolds and Raimund Herincx. Also featured were Alvar Lidell as narrator, and the composer playing pipe and hammond organs. In July 1970, The Whale was recorded in Islington, London with the same musicians. It was released as an album by The Beatles' Apple Records label later that year.

Re-release
The Apple recording was re-released on record in 1977 on Ringo Starr's label, Ring 'O Records, with a different cover.  In 1992 a CD version was released by Apple with the original cover art and libretto. In 2010 the album was once again reissued on Apple Records CD, paired with Celtic Requiem.

References

Apple Records albums
Cantatas
Compositions by John Tavener
1970 debut albums
1970s classical albums
John Tavener albums
Compositions with a narrator
Jonah
1966 compositions